Cassembe is a town in Niassa Province in northern-central Mozambique. It lies on the eastern bank of the Luambala River and on the 242 road between Lichinga to the west and Marrupa to the east.

Weather 
During late morning and early afternoon, Cassembe is very hot and humid which is stereotypical of African countries.

Late afternoon has a fair climate. Evening is full of scattered thunderstorms as well as isolated thunderstorms.

References

Populated places in Niassa Province